The second season of La Voz Senior started airing on 10 December 2020 on Antena 3. Antonio Orozco was the only coach returning from the previous season, joined by debutants David Bustamante, Pastora Soler, and Rosana Arbelo, who replace David Bisbal, Pablo López, and Paulina Rubio. Eva González returned for her second season as host.

Naida Abanovich won the season, marking David Bustamante’s first win as a coach.

Coaches 

On 8 November 2019, it was announced that Antonio Orozco would remain on the panel for the second season and would be joined by debutant coaches Rosana Arbelo, David Bustamante, and Pastora Soler, who would replace David Bisbal, Pablo López, and Paulina Rubio.

Teams 
Color key

Blind auditions 
In the Blind auditions, each coach had to complete their teams with 5 contestants. Each coach had one Block to prevent another one from getting a contestant.

Color key

Episode 1 (10 December) 

Note
: Juani Álvarez was chosen to come back to the competition; she joined Team Antonio.

Episode 2 (11 December) 

Note
: Pastora blocked Antonio, but he didn't press his button. As her team was full, Pastora didn't need a second chance to block.

The Knockouts 
In the Knockout round, also labeled as "The Semifinal", each coach had all their artists to compete in a Knockout. At the end of all performances, the coach could only advance with two of the artists into the Finale. Coaches received help from their advisors: Pitingo for Team Bustamante, David DeMaría for Team Pastora, Álex Ubago for Team Rosana, and Cami for Team Antonio.

Color key:

Finale 
In the first round of the Finale, the Top 8 artists performed and each coach selected one of them to advance for round two. In this round, each coach sang with her/his artist. Afterwards, the Top 2 was revealed, who, then, sang with season one winner, Helena Bianco.

Color key:

Elimination chart

Color key 
Artist's info

  Team Bustamante
  Team Pastora
  Team Rosana
  Team Antonio

Result details

  Winner
  Runner-up
  Third place
  Saved by her/his coach
  Eliminated

Overall

Teams

References 

2020 Spanish television seasons
Spain